The Chief of the Defence Force (CDF) is the professional head of the Namibian Defence Force. He is  responsible for the administration and the operational control of the Namibian military. The position was established after Namibia became independent in 1990. The current chief is Air Marshal Martin Pinehas, he succeeded  Lieutenant general John Mutwa.

List of chiefs

References

Namibian military leaders
Namibia